The 2011 Southampton Council election took place on 6 May 2011 to elect members of Southampton Unitary Council in Hampshire, England. One third of the council (16 seats) was up for election.  Labour won a majority of the seats being contested and the Conservatives stayed in overall control of the council.

Southampton Council is elected in thirds, which means the vote share change is compared to the corresponding 2007 Southampton Council election.

Election result
Of the 16 Council seats up for election, Labour won 10 (up from 7 in 2010) the Conservatives won 6 (no change from 2010) and the Liberal Democrats won 0 (down from 3 in 2010).

The seats that changed hands were as follows:

 Shirley (Lab gain from Con)
 Millbrook (Lab gain from Con)
 Sholing (Lab gain from Con)
 Peartree (Lab gain from Lib Dems)
 Portswood (Con gain from Lib Dems)

Overall turnout in the election was 37.0%, boosted by the AV referendum.

The night saw the Liberal Democrats lose both of their seats up for election, and their voter share reduced to under 14%. Conversely, the Conservatives saw their share of the vote improve slightly upon the previous year's, and a resurgent Labour gained their highest share of vote since 1999.

This summary box compares each party vote share with the corresponding elections in 2007.

Ward results

Bargate

Bassett

Bevois

Bitterne

Bitterne Park

Coxford

Freemantle

Harefield

Millbrook

Peartree

Portswood

Redbridge

Shirley

Sholing

Swaythling

Woolston

References

2011 English local elections
2011
2010s in Southampton